Euowenia is an extinct genus of Diprotodontia which existed from the Pliocene to the upper Pleistocene. Weighing around 500 kg, Euowenia is only known from three locations on mainland Australia, Chinchilla in Queensland, Menindee in New South Wales and the Tirari formation on the Warburton River in the Lake Eyre basin.

References

 Prehistoric Mammals of Australia and New Guinea: One Hundred Million Years of Evolution by John A. Long, Michael Archer, Timothy Flannery, and Suzanne Hand (page 79)
 Dinosaur Encyclopedia by Jayne Parsons (page 207)

Prehistoric vombatiforms
Prehistoric marsupial genera
Fossil taxa described in 1887
Pliocene marsupials
Extinct mammals of Australia